Multishow Ao Vivo - Skank no Mineirão is the eleventh live album released by Brazilian rock band Skank in 2010 by  Sony Music in DVD and CD formats. The Concert have been recorded at Mineirão in Belo Horizonte for more than 50 thousand people.
In this album, they mixed old songs, chosen by the audience in an internet polling, with new songs. The cover shows Mineirão in its inauguration in 1965.

Track listing 
Disk 1
 Mil Acasos (Samuel Rosa/Chico Amaral)
 É uma Partida de Futebol (Samuel Rosa/Nando Reis)
 Esmola (Samuel Rosa/Chico Amaral)
 Presença (Samuel Rosa/Nando Reis) (inédita)
 Ainda Gosto Dela (Samuel Rosa/Nando Reis)
 Jackie Tequila (Samuel Rosa/Chico Amaral)
 Balada do Amor Inabalável (Samuel Rosa/Fausto Fawcett)
 Acima do Sol (Samuel Rosa/Chico Amaral)
 De Repente (Samuel Rosa/Nando Reis) (inédita)
 Três Lados (Samuel Rosa/Chico Amaral)
 Vou Deixar (Samuel Rosa/Chico Amaral)
 Garota Nacional (Samuel Rosa/Chico Amaral)
 Sutilmente (Samuel Rosa/Nando Reis)
 Resposta (Samuel Rosa/Nando Reis)
 Vamos Fugir (Give Me Your Love) (Gilberto Gil/Liminha)
 Tão Seu  (Samuel Rosa/Chico Amaral)
 Fotos na Estante (Samuel Rosa / Rodrigo F. Leão) (studio version) (new song)
Disk 2
 Uma Canção É Pra Isso (Samuel Rosa/Chico Amaral)
 Um Mais um (Samuel Rosa/Rodrigo F. Leão)
 Pacato Cidadão (Samuel Rosa/Chico Amaral)
 Canção Noturna (Lelo Zaneti/Chico Amaral)
 É Proibido Fumar (Roberto Carlos/Erasmo Carlos)
 Amores Imperfeitos (Samuel Rosa/Chico Amaral)
 [Noites de um Verão Qualquer (Samuel Rosa/César Maurício)
 O Beijo e a Reza (Samuel Rosa/Chico Amaral)
 Te Ver  (Samuel Rosa/Lelo Zaneti/Chico Amaral)
 Ali (Samuel Rosa/Nando Reis)
 Dois Rios  (Samuel Rosa/Lô Borges/Nando Reis)
 Tanto (I Want You) (Bob Dylan, versão Chico Amaral)
 Saideira (Samuel Rosa/Rodrigo F. Leão)
 De Repente (Samuel Rosa/Nando Reis) (studio version) (new song)

DVD
 Belo Horizonte (intro version)
 Renascença (Samuel Rosa / Nando Reis)
 Mil Acasos
 Um Mais Um
 É Uma Partida de Futebol
 Esmola
 Pacato Cidadão
 Uma Canção é pra Isso
 É Proibido Fumar
 Presença
 Amores Imperfeitos
 Ainda Gosto Dela
 Noites de Um Verão Qualquer
 Jackie Tequila
 Balada do Amor Inabalável
 Acima do Sol
 De Repente
 Três Lados
 Vou Deixar
 Garota Nacional
 Sutilmente
 Vamos Fugir
 Saideira
 Resposta
 Te Ver
 Tanto (I Want You)
 Dois Rios
 Ali
 O Beijo e a Reza
 Canção Noturna
 Tão Seu
 Uma Canção é Pra Isso (videoclipe) (extra)
 Sutilmente (videoclipe) (extra)
 Noites de um Verão Qualquer (videoclipe) (extra)

Personnel
 Samuel Rosa - lead vocals, acoustic and electric guitar
 Henrique Portugal - keyboards, acoustic guitar, backing vocals
 Lelo Zanetti - bass, backing vocals
 Haroldo Ferretti - drums

Additional musicians
 Doca Rolim - acoustic and electric guitar, additional vocals
 Vinícius Augustus - saxophone
 Paulo Márcio - trumpet
 Pedro Aristides - trombone

References

2010 albums
Skank (band) albums